Cait or CAIT may refer to:

People
 Cait Jenner (born 1949), American television personality and Olympic gold medal-winning decathlete
 Cait O'Riordan (born 1965), bass player for punk/folk band The Pogues from 1983 to 1986

Other uses
 Cait Sith (Final Fantasy VII), a playable character in the Square role playing game Final Fantasy VII
 Cait, a character from Fallout 4
 Child abuse investigation team, United Kingdom police
 Climate Analysis Indicators Tool, by the World Resources Institute (WRI)
 Kingdom of Cait, a Pictish Kingdom in the Early Middle Ages

See also
 Caitlin, a female given name
 Cate, a female given name